Drummond Rennie is an American nephrologist and high altitude physiologist who is a contributing deputy editor of The Journal of the American Medical Association (JAMA) and an adjunct professor of medicine at the University of California, San Francisco.

He is an editor of JAMAevidence, a project for education related to evidence-based medicine sponsored by the American Medical Association. He is known for involvement in reform of scientific publishing and for advocating improvements in reporting standards for clinical trials. He was the director of the first seven International Congresses on Peer Review and Biomedical Publication, which he also helped to develop along with JAMA.

In 2008 the American Association for the Advancement of Science awarded him its Award for Scientific Freedom and Responsibility.

Career
Rennie attended Cambridge University and received his M.D. from Guy's Hospital Medical School. He became an editor at The New England Journal of Medicine in 1977 and later moved to The Journal of the American Medical Association. He has described his first contact with serious scientific misconduct in publishing as arising less than four months into his editorship.

He has organized the International Congress on Peer Review and Biomedical Publication (often known as the Peer Review Congress) since 1989, a project he launched after receiving JAMA's support for the effort in 1986.

Along with Lisa Bero, Rennie served as the co-director of the San Francisco Cochrane Center, a predecessor institution to the United States Cochrane Center, which is a component of the international Cochrane Collaboration. He is a former president of the World Association of Medical Editors and a founding member of several efforts to improve and standardize the reporting of clinical trial data, most notably the Consolidated Standards of Reporting Trials (CONSORT) project.

Awards and honors
Rennie was awarded a Mastership of the American College of Physicians in 2005. He received the 2008 AAAS Award for Scientific Freedom & Responsibility, cited “for his career-long efforts to promote integrity in scientific research and publishing”, recognizing “his outspoken advocacy for the freedom of scientists to publish in the face of efforts to suppress their research.”

References

Living people
University of California, San Francisco faculty
American nephrologists
Alumni of the University of Cambridge
21st-century American psychologists
American science writers
Year of birth missing (living people)
Alumni of King's College London